Nilfisk is a supplier of professional cleaning equipment in both industrial, commercial and consumer markets. The company is headquartered in Brøndby, Denmark, with sales entities in 45 countries and dealers in more than 100 countries. Nilfisk has manufacturing facilities in various countries.  It has approximately 4.844 employees worldwide.  The company's core businesses are the supply of industrial and commercial cleaning machines and professional high-pressure cleaning equipment. Nilfisk also markets vacuum cleaners and high-pressure cleaners to consumers. The company was owned by NKT Holding until late 2017. Nilfisk is a part of the United Nations Global Compact. The company was spun off by NKT Holdings in October 2017 and is now listed as an independent company on Nasdaq Copenhagen.

History
Nilfisk was founded in Denmark in 1906 by Peder Andersen Fisker (1875–1975) and Hans Marius Nielsen (1870–1954) as Fisker & Nielsen. Originally the company produced electrical engines as the basic component in ventilators, kitchen elevators, drilling machines and, later on, the Nimbus motorcycle. 

In 1989 NKT Holding, listed on the Copenhagen Stock Exchange, bought Fisker & Nielsen. In 1994 Nilfisk A/S acquired Advance Machine Company and in 1998 Nilfisk A/S was renamed Nilfisk-Advance. In 1998 Nilfisk-Advance merged with Euroclean/Kent and between 2000 and 2011, Nilfisk-Advance acquired CFM, Gerni, ALTO, Ecologica, United States Products, Viper, Hydramaster, Egholm, Plataforma and Jungo making Nilfisk-Advance one of the largest suppliers of professional cleaning equipment worldwide. In 2015, Nilfisk-Advance changed name to Nilfisk.

Machines 
Nilfisk produces a variety of machines in their Brooklyn Park, Minnesota production facility. Using industry leading technology, the SC50 "Liberty" Autonomous module is their flagship product, in addition to the commercial SC6500 model, and the industrial SC8000, SW8000, CS7010, and 7765 models in production.

References

External links 

 Nilfisk Annual Report 2021
 Nilfisk CSR Report 2021

 	
Industrial supply companies
Home appliance manufacturers of Denmark
Manufacturing companies based in Copenhagen
Companies based in Brøndby Municipality
Danish companies established in 1906
2017 initial public offerings
Companies listed on Nasdaq Copenhagen
Vacuum cleaner manufacturers